Gannet Island in the Montebello Islands is located at  off the Pilbara coast of Western Australia.

References

Montebello Islands archipelago